Aju Kurian Varghese (born 11 January 1985) better known as Aju Varghese is an Indian actor and producer who appears in Malayalam cinema. He made his debut in 2010 in Malarvadi Arts Club, directed by his college classmate Vineeth Sreenivasan. In a career spanning over a decade, he has acted in more than 125 Malayalam films. He owns a production company named Funtastic Films along with actor Dhyan Sreenivasan and producer Visakh Subramaniam.

Personal life and career

Aju Varghese was born to Varghese P. K. and Celiene Susan in Thiruvalla in India. He has a younger sister Anju. Aju is married to Augustina since 24 February 2014. They have twins: a girl named Juana and a boy named Evan born on 28 October 2014. They later had a second set of twins - Jake and Luke - on 30th Sep 2016.

Aju attended Rajagiri High School, Kalamasserry  and later Bhavans Adarsha Vidhyalaya, Ernakulam. He did his Bachelor's in Electronics and Communication Engineering from KCG College of Technology, Chennai. He worked in HSBC in Human Resources, Chennai. It was during that time he was called by Vineeth Sreenivasan, his college friend, to play one of the lead roles in his directorial debut Malarvadi Arts Club, and later in Thattathin Marayathu. In the meantime, he was part of Sevenes (2011) by veteran director Joshiy and Mayamohini. Since then, he has acted in notable films, such as Thattathin Marayathu, Oru Vadakkan Selfie, Kili Poyi, Zachariyayude Garbhinikal, Ohm Shanthi Oshaana, Punyalan Agarbattis, Vellimoonga, Ormayundo Ee Mukham, Kunjiramayanam, Su.. Su... Sudhi Vathmeekam, Two Countries, Adi Kapyare Kootamani, Oppam, Kodathi Samaksham Balan Vakeel and Love Action Drama

Filmography

As Actor

As Producer
Love Action Drama (2019)
Saajan Bakery Since 1962 (2021)
 Prakashan Parakkatte (2022)

As Distributor
Love Action Drama (2019)
Helen (2019)
Gauthamante Radham(2020)
Saajan Bakery since 1962(2021)

Narrator
Role Models (2017) Kiran (voice role)
Jimmy Ee Veedinte Aishwaryam (2019) Jimmy (Voice role)
Sunny (2021) Rajesh (Voice role)
 12th Man (2022) Sajish (Voice role)

Television

Short films

Awards and nominations

References

External links 
 
 

Indian male film actors
Male actors in Malayalam cinema
People from Thiruvalla
Male actors from Kerala
Living people
21st-century Indian male actors
Malayalam comedians
Indian male comedians
1985 births
Male actors in Malayalam television